The Pragmatic Sanction was an edict issued by Charles VI, Holy Roman Emperor, on 19 April 1713 to ensure that the Habsburg hereditary possessions, which included the Archduchy of Austria, the Kingdom of Hungary, the Kingdom of Croatia, the Kingdom of Bohemia, the Duchy of Milan, the Kingdom of Naples, the Kingdom of Sardinia and the Austrian Netherlands, could be inherited by a daughter undivided.

As of 1713, Charles and his wife Elizabeth Christine had not had any children. Since the death of his elder brother, Joseph I, in 1711, Charles had been the sole surviving male member of the House of Habsburg. Joseph had died without male issue, leaving Joseph's daughter Maria Josepha as the heir presumptive. That presented two problems.  First, a prior agreement with his brother, known as the Mutual Pact of Succession (1703), had agreed that in the absence of male heirs, Joseph's daughters would take precedence over Charles's daughters in all Habsburg lands. Though Charles had no children, if he were to be survived by daughters alone, they would be cut out of the inheritance. Secondly, because Salic law precluded female inheritance, Charles VI needed to take extraordinary measures to avoid a protracted succession dispute, as other claimants would have surely contested a female inheritance.

Charles VI was indeed ultimately succeeded by his own firstborn child Maria Theresa, who was born four years after the signing of the Sanction.  However, despite the promulgation of the Pragmatic Sanction, her accession in 1740 resulted in the outbreak of the War of the Austrian Succession as Charles-Albert of Bavaria, backed by France, contested her inheritance. After the war, Maria Theresa's inheritance of the Habsburg lands was confirmed by the Treaty of Aix-la-Chapelle, and the election of her husband, Francis I, as Holy Roman Emperor was secured by the Treaty of Füssen.

Background

In 1700, the senior branch of the House of Habsburg became extinct with the death of Charles II of Spain. The War of the Spanish Succession ensued, with Louis XIV of France claiming the crowns of Spain for his grandson Philip, and Leopold I, Holy Roman Emperor claiming them for his son Charles. In 1703, Charles and Joseph, Leopold's sons, signed the Mutual Pact of Succession, granting succession rights to the daughters of Joseph and Charles in the case of complete extinction of the male line but favouring the daughters of Joseph over those of Charles, as Joseph was older.

In 1705, Leopold I died and was succeeded by his elder son, Joseph I. Six years later, Joseph I died leaving behind two daughters, Archduchesses Maria Josepha and Maria Amalia. Charles succeeded Joseph, according to the Pact, and Maria Josepha became his heir presumptive.

However, Charles decided to amend the Pact to give his own future daughters precedence over his nieces. On 19 April 1713, he announced the changes in a secret session of the council.

Securing the right to succeed for his own daughters, who were not even born yet, became Charles's obsession. The previous succession laws had also forbidden the partition of the Habsburg dominions and provided for succession by females, but that had been mostly hypothetical. The Pragmatic Sanction was the first such document to be publicly announced and so required formal acceptance by the estates of the realms affected.

Foreign recognition
For 10 years, Charles VI laboured, with the support of his closest advisor, Johann Christoph von Bartenstein, to have his sanction accepted by the courts of Europe. Only the Electorate of Saxony and the Electorate of Bavaria did not accept it because it was detrimental to their inheritance rights. (Frederick Augustus II, Elector of Saxony was married to Maria Josepha and Charles, Elector of Bavaria to Maria Amalia.)

 France accepted in exchange for the duchy of Lorraine, under the Treaty of Vienna (1738).
 Spain's acceptance was also gained under the Treaty of Vienna (1738). In 1731, the 15-year-old Spanish prince Charles became the Duke of Parma and Piacenza, as Charles I, on the death of his childless granduncle Antonio Farnese. He went on to conquer Naples and Sicily, after which he returned Parma to the Emperor by the Treaty of Vienna (1738). In 1759, he became King of Spain as Charles III.
 Great Britain and the Dutch Republic accepted in exchange for the cessation of operations of the Ostend Company.
 King Frederick I of Prussia approved out of loyalty to the Emperor.

Charles VI made commitments with Russia and Augustus of Saxony, King of Poland, which caused two wars: the War of the Polish Succession against France and Spain, which cost him Naples and Sicily, and the Austro-Russian–Turkish War, which cost him Little Wallachia and northern Serbia, including the Fortress of Belgrade.

Internal recognition
Hungary, which had an elective kingship, had accepted the house of Habsburg as hereditary kings in the male line without election in 1687 but not semi-Salic inheritance. The Emperor-King agreed that if the Habsburg male line became extinct, Hungary would once again have an elective monarchy; the same was the rule in the Kingdom of Bohemia.

Maria Theresa, however, still gained the throne of Hungary. The Hungarian Parliament voted its own Pragmatic Sanction of 1723 in which the Kingdom of Hungary accepted female inheritance supporting her to become queen of Hungary. 

Croatia was one of the crown lands that supported Emperor Charles's Pragmatic Sanction of 1713 and supported Empress Maria Theresa in the War of the Austrian Succession of 1741–48 and the Croatian Parliament signed their own Pragmatic Sanction of 1712. Subsequently, the empress made significant contributions to Croatian matters by making several changes in the administrative control of the Military Frontier, the feudal and tax system. She also gave the independent port of Rijeka to Croatia in 1776.

See also 
 Pragmatic Sanction of 1830...

References

Bibliography
 Crankshaw, Edward: Maria Theresa, Longman publishers 1969
 Holborn, Hajo: A History of Modern Germany: 1648–1840 Princeton University Press 1982 
 Ingrao, Charles W: The Habsburg monarchy, 1618–1815 Cambridge University Press 2000 
 Kann, Robert A.: A history of the Habsburg Empire, 1526–1918 University of California Press. 1980 
 Mahan, J. Alexander: Maria Theresa of Austria READ BOOKS 2007 

1713 documents
1713 in Austria
1713 in law
18th century in the Habsburg monarchy
Croatia under Habsburg rule
Hungary under Habsburg rule
Legal history of Austria
Succession acts
Charles VI, Holy Roman Emperor
Frederick I of Prussia